Adam Stanisław Zieliński (28 June 1931 – 14 November 2022) was a Polish lawyer and politician. A member of the Polish United Workers' Party, he served as president of the Supreme Administrative Court of Poland from 1982 to 1992, a member of the Sejm from 1989 to 1991, and Polish Ombudsman from 1996 to 2000.

Zieliński died on 14 November 2022, at the age of 91.

References

1931 births
2022 deaths
Polish lawyers
Members of the Contract Sejm
Ombudsmen in Poland
Polish United Workers' Party members
University of Warsaw alumni
People from Pruszków